Brachmia apricata is a moth in the family Gelechiidae. It was described by Edward Meyrick in 1913. It is found in South Africa.

The wingspan is 14–16 mm. The forewings are deep yellow, slightly ferruginous tinged. The hindwings are grey.

References

Endemic moths of South Africa
Moths described in 1913
Brachmia
Taxa named by Edward Meyrick
Moths of Africa